HMS E2 (originally ordered as HMS D10) was a British E class submarine built by Chatham Dockyard. E2 was laid down on 14 February 1911 and launched on 23 November 1912.

She was sold 7 March 1921 to B Zammit, Malta.

Design

The early 'Group 1' E class boats were armed with four 18 inch (450 mm) torpedo tubes, one in the bow, one either side amidships, and one in the stern; a total of eight torpedoes were carried. Group 1 boats were not fitted with a deck gun during construction, but those involved in the Dardanelles campaign had guns mounted forward of the conning tower while at Malta Dockyard.

E-Class submarines had wireless systems with  power ratings; in some submarines, these were later upgraded to  systems by removing a midship torpedo tube. Their maximum design depth was  although in service some reached depths of below . Some submarines contained Fessenden oscillator systems.

Crew
Her complement was three officers and 28 men.

Service history
When war was declared with Germany on 5 August 1914, E2 was based at Harwich, in the 8th Submarine Flotilla of the Home Fleets.

On 14 August 1915,  E2 sank Turkish minelayer Samsun with her two officers and eight crew near Erdek.

References

Bibliography
 

 

British E-class submarines of the Royal Navy
Ships built in Chatham
1912 ships
World War I submarines of the United Kingdom
Royal Navy ship names